Silviu Simoncenco is a Romanian sprint canoer who has competed since 2007. He won a gold medal in the C-4 1000 m event at the 2007 ICF Canoe Sprint World Championships in Duisburg.

References

Living people
Romanian male canoeists
Year of birth missing (living people)
ICF Canoe Sprint World Championships medalists in Canadian